In anatomy, the gastroduodenal artery is a small blood vessel in the abdomen. It supplies blood directly to the pylorus (distal part of the stomach) and proximal part of the duodenum. It also indirectly supplies the pancreatic head (via the anterior and posterior superior pancreaticoduodenal arteries).

Structure 
The gastroduodenal artery most commonly arises from either the left hepatic artery or the right hepatic artery instead. It may also arise from the common hepatic artery of the coeliac trunk in a trifork arrangement with the two other arteries, but there are numerous variations of the origin. It first gives rise to the supraduodenal artery, followed by the posterior superior pancreaticoduodenal artery. It terminates in a bifurcation when it splits into the right gastroepiploic artery and the anterior superior pancreaticoduodenal artery (superior pancreaticoduodenal artery).

These branches form functional anastomoses with the anterior and posterior inferior pancreaticoduodenal arteries from the superior mesenteric artery. Note that the exact branching of vessels from the gastroduodenal artery is variable. Typically, the posterior and anterior superior pancreaticoduodenal arteries branch independently in that order, but can rarely come off a common trunk.

Function 
It supplies blood directly to the pylorus (distal part of the stomach) and proximal part of the duodenum. It also indirectly supplies the pancreatic head (via the anterior and posterior superior pancreaticoduodenal arteries).

Clinical significance

Peptic ulcer 
The gastroduodenal artery can be the source of a significant gastrointestinal bleed, which may arise as a complication of peptic ulcer disease. Because of its close relationship to the posteromedial wall of the second part of the duodenum, deeply penetrating ulcers or tumours of the duodenum may cause torrential bleeding from the gastroduodenal ‘artery of haemorrhage'. It occurs because the profuse arterial network in the region ensures a high flow rate in the vessel.

Additional images

References

External links
 
  - "Upper Gastrointestinal Bleeding: Surgical Perspective"
  - "Stomach, Spleen and Liver: Contents of the Hepatoduodenal ligament"
 
 

Arteries of the abdomen
Stomach